Geoffrey Drayton (13 February 1924 – 2017) was a Barbadian novelist, poet and journalist.

Life
Geoffrey Drayton was born in Barbados, and received his early education there. In 1945 he went to Cambridge University, where he read economics, after which he spent some years teaching in Ottawa, Ontario, Canada, returning to England in 1953. He worked as a freelance journalist in London and Madrid. From 1954 to 1965 he worked for Petroleum Times, becoming its editor. In 1966 he became a petroleum consultant for the Economist Intelligence Unit.

Drayton was the author of one volume of poetry, Three Meridians (1950), and two novels: Christopher (1959), which was first published in part in Bim magazine, and Zohara (1961). He also wrote short stories, such as "Mr Dombie the Zombie", which was broadcast on the BBC programme Caribbean Voices.

Drayton later lived in Spain, where he died in 2017.

Works

Novels
 Christopher, London: Collins, 1959; Heinemann Caribbean Writers Series, 1972.
 Zohara, London: Secker and Warburg, 1961.

Poetry
 Three Meridians, Toronto: Ryerson Press, 1950. 
 The Phantom, Bim, no.5 (February 1945), pg 32 
 Strindbergian Sonata, Bim, no.6 pg 16 
 Nostalgia, Bim, no.7 pg 52 
 L'Infinito de Leopardi (Translated from the Italian), Bim, no.8 pg 6 
 Memories, Bim, no.9 pg 12 
 On An Etching By Picasso, Bim, no.9 pg 57 
 The Ancient Carib, Bim, no.10 pg 116-117 
 Singing Negress, Bim, no.11 pg 242 
 Old Black Beggar, Bim, no.11 pg 246 
 To The Poets Of The Caribbean, Bim, no.11 pg 248 
 Morgan Lewis, Bim, no.13 pg 67 
 Negro Divers, Bim, no.13 pg 67 
 Double Game, Bim, no.13 pg 6 
 Translation from Catallus (Lyrics No-72: On Lesbia's Infidelity), Bim, no.14 pg 120 
 Speculations On Uranium, Bim, no.16 pg 230 
 The Star, Bim, no.17 pg 7 
 The Cobbler, Bim, no.18 pg 106

Short Stories
 Swiss Comedy, Bim, no.5 (February 1945), pgs 11-13, 57-59 
 Dear Mother, Bim, no.6, pgs 27-28, 91-93 
 No Honour Among Thieves, Bim, no.7, pgs 32-33, 105-107 
 Narcissus, Bim, no.9, pgs 10-12 
 Mr. Dombey, Bim, no.19, pgs 180-182 
 Manrique, Bim, no.22, pgs 72-73 
 Christopher, Bim, no.26, pgs 92-118 
 The Redfern Farewell, Bim, no.27, pgs 159-162 
 Sunset Over San Remo, Bim, no.31, pgs 173-175 
 Shadow And Shape, Bim, no.32, pgs 224-227 
 Return To The Island, Bim, no.40, pgs 252-256 
 The Moon And The Fisherman, Bim, no.45, pgs 17-20

Non-Fiction
 Farrago (Extracts from a notebook), Bim, no.12, pgs 281-287 
 Revisiting Barbados, Bim, no.14, pgs 83-84

Criticism
 A. N. Forde, "Christopher" (review), in Bim, vol. 8, no. 29 (June/December 1951), p. 64.
 John Harrison, "Three Meridians" (review), in Bim, vol. 4, no. 14 (June 1951), pp. 144–5.
 Kenneth Ramchand, "Terrified Consciousness", in Journal of Commonwealth Literature, no. 7 (July 1969), pp. 8–19.
 Derek Walcott, "Zohara" (review), in Trinidad Guardian, 12 November 1961, p. 26.

References

External links
 Thomas Armstrong, "Lifting the lid on Geoffrey Drayton and his outsider role in Barbadian literature", Arts Etc.

1924 births
2017 deaths
20th-century male writers
20th-century novelists
Alumni of the University of Cambridge
Barbadian journalists
Barbadian male writers
Barbadian novelists
Barbadian poets
Male journalists